"Strip" is a song by American recording artist Chris Brown, featuring American recording artist and producer Kevin McCall, released as a single from his mixtape Boy In Detention and as a buzz single from Brown's fifth studio album Fortune on November 18, 2011. It was written by Amber Streeter, Brown, Christopher Whitacre, J. Lonny Bereal, Justin Henderson and McCall, while production was handled by Tha Bizness. "Strip" peaked at number 37 on the US Billboard Hot 100, and number three on the US Hot R&B/Hip-Hop Songs chart.

Background and composition 
"Strip" was written by Amber Streeter, Chris Brown, Christopher Whitacre, J. Lonny Bereal, Justin Henderson and Kevin McCall, while production was handled by Tha Bizness. The song first appeared on Brown's mixtape Boy in Detention in 2011. On October 27, 2011, Brown announced via his official Twitter account that "Strip" and "Biggest Fan" would serve as the two lead singles from his fifth studio album Fortune (2012). However, following the online premiere of "Turn Up the Music" on January 26, 2012, several websites, including MTV News and Billboard magazine, reported that this would be the lead single from the album, while "Strip" served as a buzz single. A remix of the song made by Brown and McCall was posted online on April 5, 2012.

Musically, "Strip" is a "bouncy synth-heavy" R&B/hip hop song, with lyrics of Brown singing to a stripper. As stated by Lewis Corner of Digital Spy, it features "booty-bouncing mix of pulsing beats and '90s-styled melodies."

Music video 
The accompanying music video for "Strip" was directed by Colin Tilley and filmed in November 2011. An image from the shoot was posted online on November 27, 2011, which showed Brown surrounded by Christmas lights. The video premiered online on December 15, 2011. The video opens with Brown standing on a mountain wearing a winter jacket, cap and shorts. It then switches to a house party where Brown is seen with his shirt off, singing in a room full of people dancing. During the second chorus, Brown and McCall are seen sitting on the edge of a hot tub, while girls in bikinis are in the tub. As McCall performs his verse, he plays an accelerated game of "Seven Minutes in Heaven" with two girls in a closet. Once his time is up, he switches with another man. Throughout the video, scenes of Brown singing the song in a room full of Christmas lights are intercut.

Georgette Cline of The Boombox wrote that the video is "steaming hot". A writer for International Business Times wrote that, "The video is perfectly apt for the lyrics of the song." Chris Eggertsen of HitFix gave the video a mixed response, calling it an "embarrassingly-generic music video". Cameo appearances by Cree Summer, DJ Cereal Milk,Trey Songz and Skai Jackson.

Chart performance 
In the United States, "Strip" debuted at number 90 on the Hot R&B/Hip Hop Songs chart on the issue dated November 12, 2011, despite not being released for digital download until November 18, 2011. It peaked at number three on the issue dated March 10, 2012. The song debuted at number 85 on US Billboard Hot 100 chart on the week of December 10, 2011. It eventually peaked at number 37 on the week of March 31, 2012. On October 3, 2016, the single was certified platinum by the Recording Industry Association of America (RIAA) for combined sales and streaming equivalent units of over a million units in the United States.

Track listing 
Digital download
 "Strip" (featuring Kevin "K-MAC" McCall) – 2:49

Credits and personnel 
Credits adapted from the liner notes for Fortune

J. Lonny Bereal – songwriter
Chris Brown – lead vocals, songwriter
Doug Geikie – assistant recorder
Trehy Harris – assistant recorder
Justin Henderson – songwriter

Jaycen Joshua – mixer
Kevin McCall – guest vocals, songwriter
Brian Springer – recorder
Amber Streeter – songwriter
Tha Bizness – producer
Christopher Whitacre – songwriter

Charts

Weekly charts

Year-end charts

Certifications

Release history

References 

2011 singles
Chris Brown songs
Kevin McCall songs
Music videos directed by Colin Tilley
Songs written by Lonny Bereal
Songs written by Chris Brown
Songs written by Sevyn Streeter
2011 songs
Songs written by Kevin McCall
RCA Records singles
Song recordings produced by Tha Bizness